The chimango caracara (Milvago chimango) is a species of bird of prey in the family Falconidae, the falcons and caracaras. It is found in Argentina, Bolivia, Brazil, Chile, Paraguay, and Uruguay, and as a vagrant on the Falkland Islands.

Taxonomy and systematics

The taxonomy of the caracaras has not been settled. The American Ornithological Society and the International Ornithological Committee place the chimango and yellow-headed caracaras in genus Milvago. BirdLife International's Handbook of the Birds of the World places the chimango caracara and four others in genus Phalcoboenus and the yellow-headed caracara alone in Milvago. The Clements taxonomy places the chimango, yellow-headed, and four other caracaras in genus Daptrius. The other systems place only the black caracara in Daptrius.

The worldwide systems agree that the chimango caracara has two subspecies, the nominate M. c. chimango (Vieillot, 1816) and M. c. temucoensis (Sclater, 1918). The population in Tierra del Fuego has sometimes been proposed as a third subspecies, M. c. fuegiensis.

Description

The sexes' plumages are alike. Adults of the nominate subspecies are mostly brownish throughout. They have dark streaks on the side of the head and on their hindneck. Their undersides are mottled or barred with rufous brown. Their uppertail coverts are white and their tail is mottled grayish and white with a wide black band near the end. Their iris is brown. Males have bare yellow skin around the eye and yellow legs and feet. Females have reddish pink skin around the eye and bluish gray legs and feet. Juvenile birds have a strong rufous tinge overall and bare parts colored like the adult female's. Subspecies M. c. temucoensis is a darker smoky brown than the nominate, and their underparts are more heavily marked.

Distribution and habitat

The nominate subspecies of the chimango caracara is found in northern and central Chile and from central Argentina east through Paraguay, southern Brazil, and Uruguay to the Atlantic Ocean. It is also a non-breeding visitor north into Bolivia. Subspecies M. c. temucoensis is found from southern Chile at about Concepción Province and southern Argentina at about the Chubut River south through Tierra del Fuego to Cape Horn. Individuals have roamed to the Falkland Islands. In addition, the species was introduced to Easter Island in the early 20th century.

The chimango caracara inhabits a wide variety of open landscapes including grassy Andean foothills, heathland, shrub–steppe, and marshes. It also occurs in open woods, plantations, villages, suburban and urban areas, and coastal flats. In Argentina it is often found along roads and areas with a mix of pristine and disturbed plots. One author says it is most common in the ranching and wheat belt of the Argentinian Pampas, around Chilean fishing villages, around extensive marshlands, and at "rubbish dumps anywhere". It is the most common raptor in Argentinean Patagonia.

Behavior

Movement

The chimango caracara is a year-round resident in most of its range. Populations in the far south are partially migratory, with individuals moving north mostly in the austral winter. Members of the northern populations move into Boliva in the non-breeding season and also in small numbers as far north in Brazil as Minas Gerais and Goiás. There are a few records from the Falkland Islands.

Feeding

The chimango caracara is omnivorous, "a small-scale predator and general scavenger". Its live prey includes insects and other invertebrates, lizards, amphibians, the eggs and young of other birds, and rodents. It scavenges small roadkill and also the carcasses of larger animals after other predators have left. It eats smaller amounts of vegetable matter like rotten apples, fungi, and what it can glean from horse and cattle dung. It often follows farmers as they plow (assemblies of more than 100 birds have been observed), congregates at grass fires, and frequents fishing villages and shellfish processing plants for their waste. It pirates food from other raptors and large waterbirds. Individuals have been observed catching live fish from the surface of water.

Breeding

The chimango caracara's breeding season spans September to January, with eggs laid from mid-October to mid-November in much of its range. In areas with few trees it will nest on the ground or on tussocks in a marsh. Tree nests of adjoining pairs are usually fairly far apart. Ground nesting can be colonial, for example an observation of more than 70 nests in a  site. The clutch size is usually two or three eggs but up to five is not uncommon. The incubation period is 26 to 32 days and fledging occurs 32 to 41 days after hatch. Both sexes build the nest, incubate the clutch, and provision the young.

Cognitive behavior

The chimango caracara is an intelligent bird and has high problem solving abilities compared to other birds. "The explorative tendency, low neophobia and ability to innovate showed by M. chimango may be advantageous for this generalist and opportunistic raptor and might be some of the factors underlying its ecological success."

Vocalization

The chimango caracara is usually most vocal during the breeding season "particularly if human or other intruders [are] near nest", but also calls during disputes over food. Its most common call is a "loud petulant sqealing keeeeee-eh" that is usually made singly and often in flight. It also makes a "more chattering...keag-keah-keah..." or "ke-ew, ke-ew, ke-ew" and a "variety of squeals, growls, and hissing whistles."

Status

The IUCN has assessed the chimango caracara as being of Least Concern. It has a very large range, and though its population size is not known it is believed to be increasing. No immediate threats have been identified. "Currently thriving, perhaps benfitting in part from deforestation, and is commonest raptor through much of Chile and Argentina."

Gallery

References

External links
 Image of Chimango Caracara
 Image and description of C. Caracara

Further reading

chimango caracara
chimango caracara
Birds of Argentina
Birds of Brazil
Birds of Chile
Birds of Paraguay
Birds of Uruguay
chimango caracara
Taxa named by Louis Jean Pierre Vieillot
Taxonomy articles created by Polbot
Taxobox binomials not recognized by IUCN